AACO may refer to:

 Arab Air Carriers Organization, a regional trade organization of Arab airlines established in 1965 by the League of Arab States
 Australian Agricultural Company, a company which serves to improve beef cattle production through responsible natural resource and land use
 Arizona Association of Counties, a member association for all elected officials of Arizona's 15 counties
 The American Academy of Cosmetic Orthodontics, an organization of dentists promoting the use of Clear Aligner Therapy
 An initialization for Anne Arundel County, Maryland